Robert 'Robbie' McGhie (born 18 August 1951) is a former Australian rules football player who played in the VFL between 1969 and 1972 and again in 1979 for the Footscray Football Club, from 1973 to 1978 for the Richmond Football Club and in 1980 and 1981 for the South Melbourne Football Club. McGhie was appointed coach of the Sunshine Football Club in the VFA for the 1990 season, but the club was unable to convince the VFA to restore its licence to compete (it had been revoked about a month before McGhie's appointment) so he never coached the club in a game.

References

 Hogan P: The Tigers Of Old, Richmond FC, Melbourne 1996

External links
 
 
 

1951 births
Living people
Western Bulldogs players
Richmond Football Club players
Richmond Football Club Premiership players
Sydney Swans players
Brunswick Football Club players
Australian rules footballers from Victoria (Australia)
Two-time VFL/AFL Premiership players